A KO is a knockout in various sports, such as boxing and martial arts.

K.O., Ko or Kō may also refer to:

Arts and entertainment

Music
 KO (musician), Canadian musician who plays a fusion of hip hop and folk music
 K.O. (album), a 2021 album by Danna Paola
 K.O (rapper), South African rapper Ntokozo Mdluli
 Karen O (born 1978), lead singer of the rock group Yeah Yeah Yeahs
 Kevin Olusola, American cellist, beatboxer and member of a cappella group Pentatonix
 K.O., a 2008 album by Rize
 "K.O.", a 2004 song by Smujji

Other media
 Ko (Go), in the board game Go
 Ko (film), a 2011 Tamil action movie
 Knight Online, a 2004 online role-playing game

Language
 Ko language
 Ko (kana), the romanization of the Japanese kana こ and コ
 ISO 639-1 code for the Korean language

Surname
 Ko (Korean surname)
 Gao (surname), a surname of Chinese origin romanized to Ko in Hong Kong, and in several romanizations especially in South-east Asia
 Ke (surname), a Chinese surname romanized as "Ko" in the Wade–Giles system
 Xu (surname), a surname of Chinese Xu and customarily spelled as Ko
 Cody Ko, shortened stage name of Canadian comedian and internet celebrity Cody Michael Kolodziejzyk (born 1990)

People
 K.O (rapper) South African musician and businessman
 KO (musician), Canadian musician who plays a fusion of hip hop and folk music

 Ko Simpson (born 1983), professional American football player for the Buffalo Bills
 Kevin Owens, professional wrestler

Places
 Ko Mountain, the second-highest peak in the Sikhote-Alin Mountains of Russia
 Ko. Madhepura, Nepal, a village development committee
 Ko, Lamphun, Thailand, a village and subdistrict
 Kö, an urban boulevard in Düsseldorf, Germany

Science and technology
 Ko, an ancient Chinese weapon also known as a dagger-axe in English
 Kō, a version of the foot plough used by the Māori people
 Gene knockout, a molecular biology genetic technique, abbreviated KO
 Knowledge organization, branch of information science
 Knowledge Organization, an academic journal published by the International Society for Knowledge Organization
 kilooctet (computing), a unit of information or computer storage
 Loadable kernel module (file extension .ko)

Transportation
 Kō Station (Aichi) on the Meitetsu Nagoya Main Line in Japan
 Kō Station (Tokushima) on the Tokushima Line in Japan
 Alaska Central Express, IATA airline designator

Other uses
 The Coca-Cola Company, stock ticker symbol and corporate internet domain ko.com
 Civic Coalition (Poland), or Koalicja Obywatelska (KO), a Polish electoral alliance
 Knock-off, a counterfeit product
 Kemetic Orthodoxy, a religion
 Contracting Officer, US government acronym KO or CO
 K.O., protagonist in OK K.O.! Let's Be Heroes
 Ko Ukumori, a character in the air combat game The Sky Crawlers: Innocent Aces
 Dukkha, the concept of unsatisfactoriness in Buddhism
 Kick-off (association football), the time or manner of start of play
 Kō, Japanese for incense; see Japanese incense
 Kōdō, the art of appreciating Japanese incense

See also
 
 
 TKO (disambiguation)
 Kayo (disambiguation)
 Knockout (disambiguation)
 K0 (disambiguation)
 Kou (disambiguation)
 Gong (disambiguation), called Ko in Japanese